Man in Motion is the second studio album by American musician Warren Haynes. The album was released on May 10, 2011, by Concord Music Group. The album has sold 80,000 copies in the US as of June 2015.

Critical reception

Man in Motion received generally positive reviews from music critics. David Fricke of Rolling Stone said, "Before he became an Allman Brother and started Gov't Mule, this power-blues singer-guitarist was a Nashville cat, playing and writing country-soul music. Man in Motion is a swing back to that hardy romanticism, with more Memphis in the mix and a plaintive poise in Haynes' vocals and solos." Matt Edsall of PopMatters stated, "As the title states, Man In Motion showcases a veteran songwriter and legendary guitarist moving in new directions and expanding his already notable career. Don’t worry, though, Deadheads and Mule fanatics. You’ll still get your fill of badass guitar work."

Track listing

Charts

References

2011 albums
Warren Haynes albums